The Landscape of the Pico Island Vineyard Culture is a Unesco World Heritage Site on Pico Island, part of the archipelago of the Azores, Portugal. The landscape, with 987 ha, and the surrounding buffer zone with 1,924 ha, extend through most of the island's western, northwestern and southwestern coasts, with the majority on the municipality of Madalena and the rest on São Roque do Pico, at the foothills of Mount Pico.

The landscape is characterized by an extensive network of long, spaced apart black basalt stone walls that run parallel to the coast and penetrate towards the interior of the island. These walls were erected to protect the vines from the wind and the salty sea spray, which are planted in thousands of small rectangular enclosures locally called currais. Also part of the landscape are the buildings (manor houses, wine cellars, warehouses, conventional houses, and churches), pathways and wells, ports and ramps, that were produced by generations of farmers enabling the production of wine. This landscape has evolved over 500 years and is exceptionally well-preserved and fully authentic in its setting, materials, continued use, function, traditions, techniques, and management systems.

Gallery

See also
 Pico IPR, the officially demarcated wine region of Pico.

References

  
 UNESCO, Landscape of the Pico Island Vineyard Culture

External links 
 IGESPAR Landscape of the Pico Island Vineyard Culture
 Explore the Landscape of the Pico Island Vineyard Culture in the UNESCO collection on Google Arts and Culture

  

Pico Island
Wine regions of Portugal
World Heritage Sites in Portugal
Tourist attractions in the Azores